The Auction Block is a 1917 American silent drama film directed by Laurence Trimble and starring Rubye De Remer. The film was produced by Rex Beach, upon whose novel, The Auction Block, the film is based. It is not known whether the film survives. The film was remade as a comedy in 1926 by Metro-Goldwyn-Mayer starring Charles Ray and Eleanor Boardman.

Plot
As described in a film magazine, The parents of Lorelei Knight (De Remer) are anxious to make a small fortune off of her beauty. They send her to New York to become a member of a "girl show". Bob Wharton (Powers), the dissolute son of a millionaire, falls in love with the girl. When Lorelei learns that her father is ill and money is needed, she marries Bob although she does not love him. Bob's father (Burton) cuts off his allowance and Bob is forced to go to work. The wholesomeness of Lorelei kindles a desire in Bob to become a better man. He is getting along well when Lorelei's worthless brother leads Bob back to his old life. Lorelei is about to leave him when she is persuaded by Adoree Demorest (Johns), known as the wickedest woman in New York, and Campbell Pope (Joyner), a critic in love with Adoree, to stay. When Bob learns that he is going to be a father, he conquers his desire for drink. With the birth of their son, pleasant relations resume among Bob and Lorelei.

Cast

Reception
Like many American films of the time, The Auction Block was subject to cuts by city and state film censorship boards. For example, the Chicago Board of Censors required, in Reel 1, a cut of a long gambling scene, the two intertitles "Since you want to go on the stage, Melcher will want to see more of you" and "True to Mercher's prediction, he did want to see more of Lilas", and all indications of the young woman posing including where she is shown undressing behind screens, her handing a man a kimono and his handing it back to her, view of nude painting in the background, and the incident of maid opening secret panel admitting man to buffet flat; Reel 2, two views of nude painting, the entire incident of second young woman posing before man, the intertitle "Animated by revenge, Lilas permitted Hammon to install her in the Elegancia Apartments", and man putting had suggestively on woman's bare shoulder; Reel 3, two views of man kissing woman on neck and the intertitle "Take him to Clover roadhouse" etc.; Reel 4, five intertitles "The little flashlight will cost you $20,000" etc., "Melcher accepted a check keeping the plate as security", "In the apartments below Lilas rejoices in Hammon's absence", "Here is hoping he stays away a month", and "Fill him up with booze and we will take him to New Jersey to get married", and closeup of roulette wheel; Reel 5, the three intertitles "Hammon returns unexpectedly", "Who has been here with her", and "You can't buy me off with a string of pearls", and the shooting of the man; the three intertitles "When you redeem yourself I'll be a real wife to you", "Tell him he better pay again or his baby will be born in jail", and "As the months roll by, Bob still lives apart from his wife"; Reel 7, passionate love scene between couple to where woman leaves man at door the first time, striking man with chair over his head, and policeman striking black man on head; and Reel 8, to flash the long gambling scene.

References

External links

Plot synopsis at silenthollywood.com
Beach, Rex (1914), The Auction Block: A Novel of New York Life, New York: Harper & Brothers, on the Internet Archive
Lantern slide (Wayback, George Eastman House)

1917 films
1917 drama films
Silent American drama films
American silent feature films
American black-and-white films
Films based on American novels
Goldwyn Pictures films
Films directed by Laurence Trimble
Films based on works by Rex Beach
1910s American films
1910s English-language films